11th NYFCO Awards
December 11, 2011

Best Film: 
 The Artist 

The 11th New York Film Critics Online Awards, honoring the best in filmmaking in 2011, were given on 11 December 2011.

Winners
Best Actor:
Michael Shannon - Take Shelter
Best Actress:
Meryl Streep - The Iron Lady
Best Animated Film:
The Adventures of Tintin: The Secret of the Unicorn
Best Cast:
Bridesmaids
Best Cinematography:
The Tree of Life - Emmanuel Lubezki
Best Debut Director:
Joe Cornish - Attack the Block
Best Director:
Michel Hazanavicius - The Artist
Best Documentary Film:
Cave of Forgotten Dreams
Best Film:
The Artist
Best Film Music or Score:
The Artist - Ludovic Bource
Best Foreign Language Film:
A Separation • Iran
Best Screenplay:
The Descendants - Nat Faxon, Jim Rash and Alexander Payne
Best Supporting Actor:
Albert Brooks - Drive
Best Supporting Actress:
Melissa McCarthy - Bridesmaids
Breakthrough Performer:
Jessica Chastain - The Tree of Life, The Help, The Debt, Take Shelter, Texas Killing Fields and Coriolanus

Top Pictures of 2011
 The Artist
 The Descendants
 Drive
 The Help
 Hugo
 Melancholia
 Midnight in Paris
 Take Shelter
 The Tree of Life
 War Horse

References

New York Film Critics Online Awards
2011 film awards
2011 in American cinema
December 2011 events in the United States